Lantanophaga pusillidactyla, the lantana plume moth, is a moth of the family Pterophoridae. It is native to the southern United States, Mexico, the Caribbean, and South America. It was introduced to Australia accidentally in 1936 and is now found from Sydney to Cairns along the coast. It has also been introduced to Hawaii in 1902, Pohnpei in 1948, and Palau in 1960 for biological control. It has since been recorded from Yap in 1987–1988 and is now distributed on all islands of the Mariana and Caroline Islands where the host plant is found, except Aguijan.

Other records include Cape Verde, Republic of the Congo, Democratic Republic of the Congo, Ivory Coast, Réunion, South Africa, Madagascar, Mauritius, Nigeria, Seychelles, Eswatini, Tanzania, Zambia, Israel, Morocco, India, Indonesia (Java), New Guinea and Sri Lanka.

The wingspan is 11–14 mm.

Adults feed on flowers and lay eggs in flower heads. The larvae feed on Lantana camara, Lantana montevidensis, Lantana hispida, Lantana peduncularis, Lantana indica, Lantana involucrata, Lippia alba, Phyla nodiflora, Phyla lanceolata, Caperonia palustris, Mentha and Utricularia species. They feed inside flowers or tunnel around the base of the flower. They feed for seven to ten days and pupate in the flower clusters. The development time from egg to adult is about fourteen days.

References

External links
Australian Faunal Directory
Trin Wiki
Fact Sheet

Insects of Micronesia Lepidoptera: Pterophoridae

Platyptiliini
Moths of Australia
Moths of Cape Verde
Moths of Africa
Moths of Asia
Moths of Madagascar
Moths of Mauritius
Moths of New Zealand
Moths of Réunion
Moths of Seychelles
Moths described in 1864